Giacomo Zecca (born 6 July 1997) is an Italian footballer who plays as a forward for  club Cesena.

Club career
He made his Serie C debut for Piacenza on 3 September 2017 in a game against Cuneo.

On 1 September 2019, he signed a 3-year contract with Cesena. On 31 January 2020, he was loaned to Padova with an option to purchase.

References

External links
 

1997 births
Living people
Sportspeople from Piacenza
Italian footballers
Association football forwards
Serie C players
U.S. Sassuolo Calcio players
U.S. Cremonese players
Piacenza Calcio 1919 players
S.S. Teramo Calcio players
Cesena F.C. players
Calcio Padova players
Footballers from Emilia-Romagna